Pleurozium is a genus of mosses belonging to the family Hylocomiaceae.

The genus has almost cosmopolitan distribution.

Species:
 Pleurozium flagellare (Schimp.) Kindb.
 Pleurozium quitense (Mitt.) B.H.Allen & Magill
 Pleurozium schreberi (Brid.) Mitt.

References

Hypnales
Moss genera